Carlos Alberto López Reyes (born 4 March 1986) is a Chilean former footballer who played as a midfielder.

Teams
 Everton 2006–2007
 Universidad de Chile 2007
 Unión Quilpué 2008
 San Luis de Quillota 2009-2011
 Rangers 2012–2013
 Rangers B 2012
 San Luis de Quillota 2013–2015
 Ñublense 2015–2016
 Trasandino 2017

Titles
 San Luis de Quillota 2009 (Torneo Clausura Chilean Primera B Championship)

References

External links
 
 
 Carlos López at playmakerstats.com (English version of ceroacero.es)
 

1986 births
Living people
Sportspeople from Viña del Mar
Chilean footballers
Everton de Viña del Mar footballers
Universidad de Chile footballers
Unión Quilpué footballers
San Luis de Quillota footballers
Rangers de Talca footballers
Ñublense footballers
Trasandino footballers
Chilean Primera División players
Tercera División de Chile players
Primera B de Chile players
Segunda División Profesional de Chile players
Association football midfielders